"Julia Dream" is the B-side of the Pink Floyd single "It Would Be So Nice". The song was the first to be released by the band with lead vocals by David Gilmour.

Writing
Written by bassist Roger Waters, "Julia Dream" is characterised by the slow tempo, the airy, ambient Mellotron sounds from keyboardist Richard Wright and lush chorus vocals.

The song's lyrics include reference to an eiderdown, an item also mentioned in two other known Pink Floyd songs – Syd Barrett's "Flaming" and Gilmour/Waters's "A Pillow of Winds". The phrase "Am I really dying" will reappear in the version of the song "Mother" re-recorded for the film "Pink Floyd – The Wall".

David Gilmour's lead vocal is double tracked.

Later release
The song was later included on several compilation albums: The Early Years 1965–1972 box, The Best of the Pink Floyd, Relics, and The Early Singles disc, which was included in the Shine On box set.

Personnel
 David Gilmour – lead vocals, acoustic guitar, electric slide guitar
 Richard Wright – Mellotron, Hammond organ, backing vocals
 Roger Waters – bass, backing vocals
 Nick Mason – percussion

Covers

Mark Lanegan used to cover this song during his acoustic tour in 2010.

Acid Mothers Temple covers this song on their 2011 live acoustic album Live as a Troubadour.

Mostly Autumn covered this song on their 2005 live DVD Pink Floyd Revisited.

Shadow Gallery covered this song on their medley "Floydian Memories", found in the special edition of their 2005 Room V album.

All India Radio released a cover of this song on SoundCloud in 2019.

References

1968 songs
Pink Floyd songs
Psychedelic songs
Songs written by Roger Waters